Mike De Palmer and Gary Donnelly were the defending champions but did not compete that year.

Ricardo Acioly and Wojciech Fibak won the final on a walkover against Brad Gilbert and Slobodan Živojinović.

Seeds

  Brad Gilbert /  Slobodan Živojinović (final, withdrew)
  Pavel Složil /  Tomáš Šmíd (quarterfinals)
  Christo Steyn /  Danie Visser (semifinals)
  Gary Muller /  Michael Robertson (semifinals)

Draw

External links
 1986 CA-TennisTrophy Doubles draw

Doubles